Death of Adolphe-Simon Neboux
Richard Owen describes Anomalopteryx and publishes  History of British Fossil Mammals and Birds (1844–1846)
Graceanna Lewis (1821–1912) writes and illustrates A Natural History of Birds 
Death of Gaetano Savi
Jerdon's leafbird described by Edward Blyth 
Johann Jakob von Tschudi publishes Untersuchungen uber die Fauna Perus (1844–47) 
George Robert Gray  publishes Genera of Birds (1844–49), illustrated by David William Mitchell and Joseph Wolf 
Death of Étienne Geoffroy Saint-Hilaire
Fauna Japonica Aves commenced (1844–1850)
Johann Jakob Kaup publishes Classification der Säugethiere und Vögel
Last great auk killed 3 July 1844 on Eldey, Iceland
Pierre Adolphe Delattre publishes Ornithologie d'Europe Douai

Birding and ornithology by year
birding
birding